Bagrat, Prince of Mukhrani (Bagrat I Mukhranbatoni), (c. 1487 – c. 1540) was the third son of King Constantine II of Georgia, of the Bagrationi dynasty, and the founder of the House of Mukhrani.

Biography
Constantine II, king of Georgia now reduced to that of Kartli, made all of his sons, Bagrat among them, his co-kings, as is indicated by the position of the royal style after his name in the royal acts. Unlike his two elder brothers, however, David X and George IX, Bagrat never came to the throne of Kartli. Bagrat received in appanage the princedom of Mukhrani and the title of High Constable of Upper Kartli in reward for his vital assistance to his brother David X against the aggression from George II, a neighboring Georgian Bagratid ruler of Kakheti, in 1512. Bagrat withheld a Kakhetian siege of his fortress on the river Ksani and forced George II to withdraw. In 1513, he captured George in an ambush and put in prison where the king died, leaving Kakheti vulnerable to Bagrat's raids.

In 1539, Bagrat resigned and took holy orders under the name of Barnaba. He authored a polemical work A Story of Religion of Ismaelite Infidels (მოთხრობაჲ სჯულთა უღმერთოთა ისმაილიტთაჲ), a Christian apology critical of Islam.

Family
Bagrat was married to a certain Elene. He had ten children:

 Prince Vakhtang (1511–1580), Prince of Mukhrani.
 Prince Erekle (1527–1556). He was married to Princess Elene, daughter of Levan of Kakheti. 
 Princess Dedisimedi (died c. 1595), consort of Kaikhosro II Jaqeli, Atabeg of Samtskhe.
 Prince Aleksandre (fl. 1550–1604).
 Prince Ioanatan (fl. 1548–1572).
 Princess Guldapar (died c. 1572).
 Princess Teodora (died after 1572).
 Prince Iotam (died after 1572).
 Prince Ashotan (died 1561), co-Prince of Mukhrani and father of Saint Ketevan the Martyr. 
 Prince Archil (fl. 1540 – 25 November 1582), captive in Iran from 1560 to 1576.

References

1480s births
1540s deaths

Year of birth uncertain
Year of death uncertain
House of Mukhrani
Christian monks from Georgia (country)
Male writers from Georgia (country)
15th-century people from Georgia (country)
16th-century people from Georgia (country)